Shkëlzen Ruçi (born 1 July 1992) is an Albanian professional footballer who plays as a goalkeeper for SC Gjilani in Kosovo.

Club career

Luftëtari Gjirokastër
On 22 July 2016, Ruçi joined Luftëtari Gjirokastër just promoted to top flight by signing until June 2018. He played his first match for the club on 28 September in the first leg of 2016–17 Albanian Cup first round versus his former side Elbasani, keeping a clean-sheet as his side won 1–0. His league debut later on 30 November versus Skënderbeu Korçë, with Luftëtari caused an upset as the match ended in a goalless draw.

References

External links

Profile at UEFA.com
 Profile - FSHF

1992 births
Living people
Footballers from Elbasan
Albanian footballers
Association football goalkeepers
KF Elbasani players
KF Bylis Ballsh players
Luftëtari Gjirokastër players
SC Gjilani players
Kategoria Superiore players
Kategoria e Parë players
Football Superleague of Kosovo players
Albanian expatriate footballers
Expatriate footballers in Kosovo
Albanian expatriate sportspeople in Kosovo